Ganev (masculine) or Ganeva (feminine) is a Bulgarian surname. Notable people with the surname include:

Dimitar Ganev (1898–1964), Bulgarian communist politician
Guinio Ganev (1928–2016), Bulgarian politician, MP and national ombudsman
Lyubomir Ganev (born 1965), Bulgarian volleyball player
Mihail Ganev (born 1985), Bulgarian sport wrestler
Nikolay Ganev (born 1955), Bulgarian former swimmer
Petko Ganev (born 1996), Bulgarian professional footballer
Stoyan Ganev (1955–2013), Bulgarian diplomat, politician and jurist
Valentin Ganev (born 1956), Bulgarian theatre and film actor and theatre director
Venelin Ganev (1880–1966), Bulgarian lawyer, diplomat and politician
Veselin Ganev (born 1987), Bulgarian footballer
Hennadiy Hanyev (born 1990), Ukrainian footballer of Bulgarian descent

Bulgarian-language surnames